The Alderson Broaddus Battlers football program is a college football team that represents Alderson Broaddus University (commonly shortened to AB; previously just "Broaddus College" and then "Alderson–Broaddus College") as an NCAA Division II independent. AB's current all-sports conference, the Great Midwest Athletic Conference, does not sponsor football.

The team has had eleven head coaches since its first recorded football game in 1905. The program ceased play in 1930, but in 2012 it was announced that it will begin playing once again starting with the 2012 season under new head coach Dennis Creehan. He would play with them until 2016 after stepping down to coach at The Spring League.

Key

Coaches

Notes

References
 
 

Alderson Broaddus Battlers

West Virginia sports-related lists